The grey-capped greenfinch or Oriental greenfinch (Chloris sinica) is a small passerine bird in the finch family Fringillidae that breeds in broadleaf and conifer woodlands of the East Palearctic.

The grey-capped greenfinch is a medium-sized finch  in length, with a strong bill and a short slightly forked tail. It nests in trees or bushes, laying 3-5 eggs.

In 1760 the French zoologist Mathurin Jacques Brisson included a description of the grey-capped greenfinch in his Ornithologie based on a specimen collected in China. He used the French name Le pinçon de la Chine and the Latin Fringilla sinencis. Although Brisson coined Latin names, these do not conform to the binomial system and are not recognised by the International Commission on Zoological Nomenclature. When in 1766 the Swedish naturalist Carl Linnaeus updated his Systema Naturae for the twelfth edition, he added 240 species that had been previously described by Brisson. One of these was the grey-capped greenfinch. Linnaeus included a brief description, coined the binomial name Fringilla sinica and cited Brisson's work. The type locality was subsequently restricted to Macau in eastern China. The specific name sinica is Medieval Latin for Chinese.

The greenfinches were later placed in the genus Carduelis but when molecular phylogenetic studies found that they were not closely related to the other species in Carduelis, the greenfinches were moved to the resurrected genus Chloris. The genus had been introduced by the French naturalist Georges Cuvier in 1800. The word Chloris is from the Ancient Greek khlōris for a European greenfinch; the specific epithet sinica is Mediaeval Latin for "Chinese".

Five subspecies are now recognised:
  C. s. ussuriensis Hartert, 1903 – northeastern China, Korea and eastern Siberia
  C. s. kawarahiba (Temminck, 1836) – Kamchatka Peninsula, Kuril Islands and northeastern Hokkaido
  C. s. minor (Temminck & Schlegel, 1848) – Japan: southern Hokkaido to Kyushu
  C. s. kittlitzi (Seebohm, 1890) – Bonin Islands including Iwo Jima
  C. s. sinica (Linnaeus, 1766) – central and eastern China to central Vietnam

References

External links

Xeno-canto: audio recordings of the grey-capped greenfinch

Chloris (bird)
Birds of Japan
Birds described in 1766
Taxa named by Carl Linnaeus